Rory Sutherland (born 24 August 1992) is a Scottish rugby union player who plays for Ulster Rugby in the United Rugby Championship.

Education
Sutherland is a former Trinity Primary and Hawick High School pupil.

Playing career
Sutherland came through the ranks with his hometown club and school sides before representing the Borders and Scotland at under-17 and under-18 in the back-row.

He switched to loose-head prop during his first season of senior rugby at Hawick and, after a season with Biggar, caught the attention of RBS Premiership runners-up and Border League winners Gala.

In 2017, Sutherland suffered a serious adductor injury that threatened his career and required him to spend time in a wheelchair.

While on the 2021 British & Irish Lions tour to South Africa it was announced that Sutherland would join Worcester Warriors ahead of the 2021/22 season. On 5 October 2022 all Warriors players had their contracts terminated due to the liquidation of the company to which they were employed. Following the termination of his Worcester Warriors contract, Sutherland signed a short-term contact with Ulster.

International career
Sutherland received his first call up to the senior Scotland squad by coach Vern Cotter on 19 January 2016 for the 2016 Six Nations Championship. Sutherland got his first Scotland cap during the Six Nations against Ireland in 2016. By 2021, he had made 18 appearances for Scotland, 16 as a starter and two as a replacement.

British & Irish Lions
In May 2021, Sutherland was selected in the 37-man squad for the British and Irish Lions tour of South Africa. He took to the field in the opening warmup match against Japan at Murrayfield, becoming Lion #840. After strong performances in the tour's warm-up matches, he was selected on the substitutes' bench for the first Test but was subsequently elevated to the starting line up just hours before kick-off. He played 55 minutes as the Lions won 17–22 to lead the series. Then he came off the bench the following week for his second Test cap.

Personal life
Sutherland has a long-term partner and they have two children.

References

External links 
 profile at Edinburgh Rugby
 

1992 births
Living people
Hawick RFC players
People educated at Hawick High School
Scottish rugby union players
Scotland Club XV international rugby union players
Scotland international rugby union players
Edinburgh Rugby players
Worcester Warriors players
Rugby union props
British & Irish Lions rugby union players from Scotland
Rugby union players from Melrose, Scottish Borders
Ulster Rugby players